This is a list of people who have served as Custos Rotulorum of Lincolnshire.

At the inception of the office (bef. 1544), a custos rotulorum was appointed for each of the three Parts of Lincolnshire. By 1554 these were Richard Ogle for Holland, Sir Richard Hussey for Kesteven, and Sir Thomas Heneage for Lindsey. This arrangement was discontinued with the appointment of a single custos for all Lincolnshire in 1549.

Lincolnshire
 Sir John Hussey 1513

Kesteven
 Sir Richard Hussey c.1544

Holland
 Richard Ogle c.1544

Lindsey

 Sir Robert Sheffield by 1516–?1518
 Sir Thomas Heneage c.1544

Lincolnshire

 William Cecil, 1st Baron Burghley 1549 – aft. 1584
 Thomas Cecil, 1st Earl of Exeter bef. 1594 – aft. 1608
 William Cecil, 2nd Earl of Exeter 1619–1640
 Montagu Bertie, 2nd Earl of Lindsey 1640–1666
For later custodes rotulorum, see Lord Lieutenant of Lincolnshire.

References

External links
Institute of Historical Research - Custodes Rotulorum 1544-1646
Institute of Historical Research - Custodes Rotulorum 1660-1828

Lincolnshire
History of Lincolnshire
Local government in Lincolnshire